Song Khwae is a district (amphoe) in the northwestern part of Nan province, northern Thailand.

History
The minor district (king amphoe) Song Khwae was established on 1 April 1992 with three tambons split off from Chiang Klang district. It was upgraded to a full district on 11 October 1997.

Geography
Neighboring districts are, from the east clockwise, Thung Chang, Chiang Klang and Tha Wang Pha of Nan Province, Pong and Chiang Kham of Phayao province. To the north it borders Xaignabouli province of Laos.

Administration
The district is divided into three sub-districts (tambons), which are further subdivided into 25 villages (mubans). Yot is the township (thesaban tambon) and covers tambon Yot. There are a further two tambon administrative organizations (TAO).

References

External links
amphoe.com

Song Khwae